MKN, Mkn or mkn may refer to:

 Macedonian denar, the currency of North Macedonia
 Markarian galaxies, are often abbreviated "Mkn" (also Mrk, Mkr, Ma, Mk, Mark), followed by their four-digit number
 the ISO 639:m, language code for Malay
 the ICAO airline code for Mekong Airlines